There are a number of listed buildings in Staffordshire. The term "listed building", in the United Kingdom, refers to a building or structure designated as being of special architectural, historical, or cultural significance. Details of all the listed buildings are contained in the National Heritage List for England. They are categorised in three grades: Grade I consists of buildings of outstanding architectural or historical interest, Grade II* includes significant buildings of more than local interest and Grade II consists of buildings of special architectural or historical interest. Buildings in England are listed by the Secretary of State for Culture, Media and Sport on recommendations provided by English Heritage, which also determines the grading.

Some listed buildings are looked after by the National Trust or English Heritage while others are in private ownership or administered by trusts.

Listed buildings by grade
 Grade I listed buildings in Staffordshire
 Grade II* listed buildings in Cannock Chase (district)
 Grade II* listed buildings in East Staffordshire
 Grade II* listed buildings in Lichfield (district)
 Grade II* listed buildings in Newcastle-under-Lyme (borough)
 Grade II* listed buildings in South Staffordshire
 Grade II* listed buildings in Stafford (borough)
 Grade II* listed buildings in Staffordshire Moorlands
 Grade II* listed buildings in Stoke-on-Trent
 Grade II* listed buildings in Tamworth (borough)

Listed buildings by civil parish or unparished area

Cannock Chase 

Listed buildings in Brereton and Ravenhill
Listed buildings in Brindley Heath
Listed buildings in Cannock
Listed buildings in Heath Hayes and Wimblebury
Listed buildings in Hednesford
Listed buildings in Norton Canes
Listed buildings in Rugeley

City of Stoke-on-Trent 

Listed buildings in Stoke-on-Trent

East Staffordshire 

Listed buildings in Abbots Bromley
Listed buildings in Anglesey, Staffordshire
Listed buildings in Anslow
Listed buildings in Barton-under-Needwood
Listed buildings in Blithfield
Listed buildings in Branston, Staffordshire
Listed buildings in Burton, Staffordshire (civil parish)
Listed buildings in Burton upon Trent
Listed buildings in Croxden
Listed buildings in Denstone
Listed buildings in Draycott in the Clay
Listed buildings in Dunstall
Listed buildings in Ellastone
Listed buildings in Hanbury, Staffordshire
Listed buildings in Hoar Cross
Listed buildings in Horninglow and Eton
Listed buildings in Kingstone, Staffordshire
Listed buildings in Leigh, Staffordshire
Listed buildings in Marchington
Listed buildings in Mayfield, Staffordshire
Listed buildings in Newborough, Staffordshire
Listed buildings in Okeover
Listed buildings in Outwoods, East Staffordshire
Listed buildings in Ramshorn
Listed buildings in Rocester
Listed buildings in Rolleston on Dove
Listed buildings in Shobnall
Listed buildings in Stanton, Staffordshire
Listed buildings in Stapenhill
Listed buildings in Stretton, East Staffordshire
Listed buildings in Tatenhill
Listed buildings in Tutbury
Listed buildings in Uttoxeter
Listed buildings in Uttoxeter Rural
Listed buildings in Winshill
Listed buildings in Wootton, Staffordshire
Listed buildings in Wychnor
Listed buildings in Yoxall

Lichfield 

Listed buildings in Alrewas
Listed buildings in Armitage with Handsacre
Listed buildings in Burntwood
Listed buildings in Clifton Campville
Listed buildings in Colton, Staffordshire
Listed buildings in Curborough and Elmhurst
Listed buildings in Drayton Bassett
Listed buildings in Edingale
Listed buildings in Elford
Listed buildings in Farewell and Chorley
Listed buildings in Fazeley
Listed buildings in Fisherwick
Listed buildings in Fradley and Streethay
Listed buildings in Hammerwich
Listed buildings in Hamstall Ridware
Listed buildings in Harlaston
Listed buildings in Hints, Staffordshire
Listed buildings in Kings Bromley
Listed buildings in Lichfield
Listed buildings in Longdon, Staffordshire
Listed buildings in Mavesyn Ridware
Listed buildings in Shenstone, Staffordshire
Listed buildings in Swinfen and Packington
Listed buildings in Thorpe Constantine
Listed buildings in Wall, Staffordshire
Listed buildings in Weeford
Listed buildings in Whittington, Staffordshire
Listed buildings in Wigginton and Hopwas

Newcastle-under-Lyme 

Listed buildings in Audley Rural
Listed buildings in Balterley
Listed buildings in Betley
Listed buildings in Chapel and Hill Chorlton
Listed buildings in Keele
Listed buildings in Kidsgrove
Listed buildings in Loggerheads, Staffordshire
Listed buildings in Madeley, Staffordshire
Listed buildings in Maer, Staffordshire
Listed buildings in Newcastle-under-Lyme
Listed buildings in Silverdale, Staffordshire
Listed buildings in Whitmore, Staffordshire

South Staffordshire 

Listed buildings in Acton Trussell, Bednall and Teddesley Hay
Listed buildings in Bobbington
Listed buildings in Brewood and Coven 
Listed buildings in Blymhill and Weston-under-Lizard
Listed buildings in Cheslyn Hay
Listed buildings in Codsall
Listed buildings in Coppenhall
Listed buildings in Dunston, Staffordshire
Listed buildings in Enville, Staffordshire
Listed buildings in Essington
Listed buildings in Featherstone, Staffordshire
Listed buildings in Hatherton, Staffordshire
Listed buildings in Hilton, South Staffordshire
Listed buildings in Himley
Listed buildings in Kinver
Listed buildings in Lapley, Stretton and Wheaton Aston
Listed buildings in Lower Penn
Listed buildings in Pattingham and Patshull
Listed buildings in Penkridge
Listed buildings in Perton
Listed buildings in Saredon
Listed buildings in Shareshill
Listed buildings in Swindon, Staffordshire
Listed buildings in Trysull and Seisdon
Listed buildings in Wombourne

Stafford 

Listed buildings in Adbaston
Listed buildings in Barlaston
Listed buildings in Berkswich
Listed buildings in Bradley, Staffordshire
Listed buildings in Brocton, Staffordshire
Listed buildings in Chebsey
Listed buildings in Church Eaton
Listed buildings in Colwich, Staffordshire
Listed buildings in Creswell, Staffordshire
Listed buildings in Doxey
Listed buildings in Eccleshall
Listed buildings in Ellenhall
Listed buildings in Forton, Staffordshire
Listed buildings in Fradswell
Listed buildings in Fulford, Staffordshire
Listed buildings in Gayton, Staffordshire
Listed buildings in Gnosall
Listed buildings in Haughton, Staffordshire
Listed buildings in High Offley
Listed buildings in Hilderstone
Listed buildings in Hixon, Staffordshire
Listed buildings in Ingestre
Listed buildings in Marston, Milwich
Listed buildings in Milwich
Listed buildings in Norbury, Staffordshire
Listed buildings in Ranton, Staffordshire
Listed buildings in Salt and Enson
Listed buildings in Sandon and Burston
Listed buildings in Seighford
Listed buildings in Stafford (Central Area)
Listed buildings in Stafford (Outer Area)
Listed buildings in Standon, Staffordshire
Listed buildings in Stone, Staffordshire
Listed buildings in Stone Rural
Listed buildings in Stowe-by-Chartley
Listed buildings in Swynnerton
Listed buildings in Tixall
Listed buildings in Weston, Staffordshire

Staffordshire Moorlands 

Listed buildings in Alton, Staffordshire
Listed buildings in Alstonefield
Listed buildings in Bagnall, Staffordshire
Listed buildings in Biddulph
Listed buildings in Blore with Swinscoe
Listed buildings in Bradnop
Listed buildings in Brown Edge
Listed buildings in Butterton
Listed buildings in Caverswall
Listed buildings in Cheadle, Staffordshire
Listed buildings in Checkley
Listed buildings in Cheddleton
Listed buildings in Consall
Listed buildings in Cotton, Staffordshire
Listed buildings in Dilhorne
Listed buildings in Draycott in the Moors
Listed buildings in Endon and Stanley
Listed buildings in Farley, Staffordshire
Listed buildings in Fawfieldhead
Listed buildings in Forsbrook
Listed buildings in Grindon, Staffordshire
Listed buildings in Heathylee
Listed buildings in Heaton, Staffordshire
Listed buildings in Hollinsclough
Listed buildings in Horton, Staffordshire
Listed buildings in Ipstones
Listed buildings in Ilam, Staffordshire
Listed buildings in Kingsley, Staffordshire
Listed buildings in Leek, Staffordshire
Listed buildings in Leekfrith
Listed buildings in Longnor, Staffordshire
Listed buildings in Longsdon
Listed buildings in Oakamoor
Listed buildings in Onecote
Listed buildings in Quarnford
Listed buildings in Rushton, Staffordshire
Listed buildings in Sheen, Staffordshire
Listed buildings in Tittesworth
Listed buildings in Warslow and Elkstones
Listed buildings in Waterhouses, Staffordshire
Listed buildings in Werrington, Staffordshire
Listed buildings in Wetton, Staffordshire

Tamworth 

Listed buildings in Tamworth, Staffordshire

References

 
Staffordshire